Sold is a novel by Patricia McCormick, published in 2006. It tells the story of a girl from Nepal named Lakshmi, who is sold into sexual slavery in India. The novel is written in a series of short, vignette-style chapters, from the point of view of the main character. The 2014 movie Sold by Oscar-winning director Jeffrey D. Brown is based on the same novel.

Plot
Lakshmi is a thirteen-year-old girl living with her family in a small hut in the mountains of Nepal. Her family is desperately poor, but her life is full of simple pleasures, like raising her black-and-white speckled goat, and having her mother brush her hair by the light of an oil lamp. But now the harsh Himalayan monsoons wash away all that remains of the family's crops, Lakshmi's stepfather says she must leave home and take a job to support her family.

He introduces her to a charming stranger who tells her she will find her a job as a maid working for a wealthy woman in the city. Glad to be able to help, Lakshmi undertakes the long journey to India and arrives at “Happiness House” full of hope. But she soon learns the horrible truth: she has been sold into prostitution.

An old woman named Mumtaz rules the brothel with cruelty and cunning. She tells Lakshmi that she is trapped there until she can pay off her family's debt – then cheats Lakshmi of her meager earnings so that she can never leave.

Lakshmi's life becomes a nightmare from which she cannot escape. Still, she lives by her mother's words – “Simply to endure is to triumph” – and gradually, she forms friendships with the other girls that enable her to survive in this terrifying new life.  She also teaches herself to read and speak in English through listening to the conversations of people around her and books she manages to take.

Eventually, Lakshmi meets an American man, who arrives and disguises himself as a client to gather the evidence he needs to prosecute Mumtaz and her associates. Mumtaz is ultimately arrested, thus freeing Lakshmi and the other girls.

Characters
Lakshmi, a thirteen-year-old farm girl in danger, the narrator and protagonist of the novel. When the monsoons come and her family's crops are destroyed, she is sold into sex slavery by her stepfather.
Ama, Lakshmi's  mother; she is described as a typical village wife. She bears her family's struggles by being the only working adult in their household, but she still manages to be beautiful, at least in her daughter's eyes: “My ama, with her crow-black hair braided...her dark brown skin, and her ears hung with the joyful noise of tinkling gold, to me, is more lovely.”
Stepfather, a lazy gambler, and Ama's second husband. He spends his days at the tea shop gambling and conversing with the old men and sees no value in Lakshmi. Stepfather is always willing to spend the family's earnings on unnecessary selfish items for himself.
Gita: Lakshmi's best friend. She went to the city to work for a rich family and send money back to her own.
Tali: Lakshmi's goat. She gives the milk Lakshmi makes cheese with. She follows Lakshmi around a lot as if it were her child and acts as the young girl's best friend
Bajai Sita, described as the first who bought Lakshmi.
Auntie Bimla, described as a modern woman by Lakshmi, whom she takes on a long journey into the city where the naive farm girl thinks she is going to work as a maid.
Uncle Husband, described as a “slapping man”, takes Lakshmi across the border to the place where she is to work. While on their journey, he orders her to call him husband, probably because he didn't want to attract any negative attention towards them. After he drops Lakshmi off at her destination, the Happiness House, she never sees him again.
Mumtaz, the owner of the Happiness House, she is portrayed as a cruel and selfish woman. She oversees all the girls and “manages” their debts. Mumtaz is known for her ruthless punishments such as locking girls up for weeks, beating and starving them, as well as punishing any girls who try to escape or receive gifts from customers by dipping a stick in a mixture of chili peppers and shoving it up the offending girl's vagina. She instills fear in every inhabitant of the Happiness House.
Shahanna, Lakshmi's first friend at the Happiness House, a girl with “teardrop eyes and deep brown skin, like the hide of a nut”. Shahanna is from Lakshmi's country and helps her get accustomed to her new life. In the novel they become best friends, sticking together to survive Mumtaz's wrath. Shahanna is taken away when the police raid the Happiness House because Mumtaz was late on her bribes to them.
Pushpa, a “coughing woman”, she is one of Lakshmi's roommates in the novel. Pushpa came to work for Mumtaz when her husband died. She has a baby girl and an eight-year-old son. Her illness gets her and her children kicked out of the house by Mumtaz who feels Pushpa is a waste of her money.
Shilpa, the “Aging Bird Girl”, is Mumtaz's spy. Her character is described as having “the reed-thin body of a girl and the hollow cheeks of an old woman. She is, under the folds of her yellow dress, frail as a baby bird.” Shilpa is at the Happiness House at her own volition. Shilpa is also an alcoholic.
Anita, The “half frowning girl”, is one of Lakshmi's roommates. In the novel, Anita is also from Lakshmi's and Shahanna's country. Once she ran away but the goonda (men who work for Mumtaz) caught her, beat her, and returned her to the Happiness House. They are the reason her face is lopsided. It's hard to read Anita sometimes because of her aloof manner, but she and Lakshmi become friends towards the end of the novel.
Harish, The David Beckham boy, is Pushpa's eight-year-old son. He is obsessed with David Beckham and soccer. He goes to school everyday and comes home to the Happiness House. In the novel Lakshmi is envious of Harish because he gets to live a semi-normal life and she doesn't. After he catches her looking at his book, Harish offers to teach Lakshmi English and Hindi. Harish runs errands for the girls and their customers at night. Sometimes he earns a few rupees. He is “a boy of about eight [...]. He has hair that sticks up like the tassels on a cornstalk and knees as knobby as a baby goat's.”
Street Boy, a tea vendor. He comes to the Happiness House everyday to sell tea to the girls. He flirts with them but doesn't sleep with them. At first, Lakshmi is ashamed to be seen in the Happiness House by him, but when he starts giving her gifts of food, they form a bond. Unfortunately, he is given a new route, and they never see each other again. Lakshmi never learns this character's name.
Monica, one of the highest earning characters in the Happiness house, has almost paid off her debt. She also has a very short temper. She has a daughter at her home who she's paying school fees for. Monica says the people will thank and honor her and Lakshmi when they get home for sending money. When Monica returns home, she is not greeted with honor, but run out of her own village and comes back to the Happiness House. After a while, she is thrown out because she caught the “virus”.
American Customer #1: He pays for Lakshmi but does not sleep with her. Instead, he talks to her and tries to see if she wants to leave Happiness House. Lakshmi remains quiet during the exchange. He gives her a card.
American Customer #2: He is not a good American nor is interested in trying to rescue Lakshmi from Happiness House. He arrives drunk and sleeps with Lakshmi.
American Customer #3: Comes and asks Lakshmi questions. He takes a photograph of Lakshmi. The girl actually converses with him, somewhat. He says he will come back for Lakshmi, and he does. She leaves with him.
Habib: Lakshmi's first "customer".

Reception
Sold received positive reviews for exposing readers to an unfamiliar world. Kirkus reviews, for instance, commented that “McCormick provides readers who live in safety and under protection of the law with a vivid window into a harsh and cruel world.” Booklist agreed, saying Sold is “[a]n unforgettable account of sexual slavery as it exists now.”

Awards and honors
ALA Top 10 Best Book for Young Adults 2007 
National Book Award Finalist 2007
National Public Radio - Top 100 Books of the Year 2007
Book Sense Pick 2007
California Young Reader Medal 2007
Quill Award 2007
Gustav-Heinemann-Peace Prize 2008
Elliot Rosewater Award 2009-2010

References

Bibliography
McCormick, Patricia. Sold. New York, New York: Hyperion Books for Children, 2008.

External links
Sold ~ The Movie
McCormick's official website

2006 American novels
Novels set in India
Novels about Indian prostitution
Novels about child sexual abuse
Novels set in Nepal
American young adult novels
Human trafficking in Nepal
Human trafficking in India
American novels adapted into films
Novels about child abduction
Novels about child prostitution